State Highway 121 (SH 121) is a state highway angling from southwest to northeast through north central Texas. It runs from Cleburne, Texas at US 67 to SH 78 in Bonham, Texas, just north of a junction with US 82.

Between Fort Worth and Euless, SH 121 is known as Airport Freeway (east of Euless, this name applies to SH 183).  East of Coppell, the highway functions as the frontage road for the Sam Rayburn Tollway, a toll road that runs northeast to McKinney. From McKinney to Melissa, the state highway is concurrent with US 75 and the North Central Expressway. Northeast of Melissa, SH 121 is a less-traveled roadway often referred to as the Sam Rayburn Highway.

Route description 

Sections between downtown Fort Worth and Grapevine are freeway, including a small segment near Hurst that coincides with Interstate 820. At Bedford, Texas it has an interchange with SH 183, the Irving freeway that leads toward Dallas; it has an interchange with SH 360, which leads toward Arlington, just to the west of the north entrance to the Dallas/Fort Worth International Airport, to which State Highway 121 gives access.  At Grapevine it has interchanges with SH 114 and Interstate 635 before becoming a limited-access tollway that passes between Lewisville and Frisco.

It is very heavily traveled south and west of McKinney and has become an urban highway due to the rapid growth of the Dallas–Fort Worth metroplex.  Service roads extending southwest to northeast along the corridor from Lewisville to McKinney are free of charge; however the main lanes within the right-of-way are tolled as part of the Sam Rayburn Tollway operated by the North Texas Tollway Authority (NTTA). The highway's northeastern section between Melissa and Bonham carries less traffic and until recently was a two-lane rural highway.  However, in recent years with an increase in traffic, the 19 mile section between the Collin-Fannin County line and its junction with SH 56 in Bonham has been upgraded to a "Super Two" highway system.  This allows for alternating passing lanes.  Beginning in 2016, the segment between Melissa and the Collin-Fannin County line is being upgraded to a four-lane divided highway system.  In addition, a two-mile stretch between SH 56 and US 82 within Bonham city limits, was upgraded to a four-lane highway system with a continuous left-hand turn lane.  Long term planning calls for upgrading the 19 mile stretch, from the Collin-Fannin County line to SH 56 in Bonham, into a four-lane divided highway system.
 
It meets Interstate 35E at Lewisville, SH 289 near Frisco, US 75 and US 380 in McKinney, US 69 at Trenton, and SH 78 just north of Bonham.

Construction began in 2009 on the extension of 121 south from Fort Worth to Cleburne, as a toll road called Chisholm Trail Parkway in Tarrant and Johnson Counties. This section is operated by the NTTA and the entire project, from I-30 to U.S. 67 opened to traffic in 2013.

In March 2009, work was completed on the eventual southbound lanes on a short stretch of 121 northeast of DFW Airport, which currently shares southbound and northbound traffic. This work upgraded two signalized at-grade intersections to a freeway, with overpasses at both intersections, improving traffic in that area. The northbound freeway lanes are currently under construction, which also include new, separate exits and entrances for Freeport Parkway and Grapevine Mills Boulevard/Sandy Lake Road.

Sam Rayburn Tollway 

From McKinney to Coppell, State Highway 121 acts as a frontage road to Sam Rayburn Tollway, contrary to the popular misconception that the Sam Rayburn Tollway was the new SH 121.

Controversy
In early 2007, the Spanish firm Cintra agreed to a $2.8 billion, 50-year deal where they would lease the highway from TxDOT, finish building and maintain it, and collect the tolls.  However, critics of the deal questioned both its length—the contract allowed Cintra to collect tolls for 50 years—and the fact that the North Texas Tollway Authority (NTTA) was prevented from bidding on the contract.  In addition, general opposition to the toll plan organized, pointing out that the segment through Denton County had already been paid for by taxpayer money.

To answer some of these complaints, Texas legislators pressed the Texas Department of Transportation to allow the NTTA to bid. The Authority announced their proposed bid in early May 2007, which would provide approximately $3.3 billion in road funding, but is based on traffic counts that differ from those used by Cintra.

On June 28, 2007, the Texas Transportation Commission announced it would pursue the proposal from the North Texas Tollway Authority (NTTA).

History
SH 121 was originally numbered on March 17, 1927, as a direct routing between Fort Worth and SH 40 near the Dallas-Denton County line. On April 24, 1928, it extended to McKinney. By 1933, the route had been completed from Ft. Worth northeast through Grapevine to its intersection with SH 40/U.S. Route 77 in far southern Denton County. On July 15, 1935, the east end was truncated to the Denton-Dallas county line. On January 6, 1939, the section from the Dallas-Denton County line to SH 40/US 77 was restored. A road was designated on February 21, 1938, from SH 114 to SH 121; either SH 114 Loop or SH 121 Loop. This was renumbered as Loop 10 on September 26, 1939.

On November 24, 1941, SH 121 was extended from old US 77 to new US 77. On December 16, 1943, the section of SH 121 from US 77 (former SH 40) to McKinney was restored, and the ambitious plan to extend SH 121 northeast beyond McKinney to Bonham was approved by TxDOT, a part of which absorbed Farm to Market Road 82 between Bonham and Trenton. The section from Bonham to Randolph was designated as SH 263 until March 21, 1939. But it wasn't until 1954 that the next section of this highway was completed between U.S. 77 at Lewisville and U.S. Route 75 near McKinney. The final section between McKinney and Trenton was not completed until November 20, 1963, including an extension around the western side of Bonham. In 1965, the section from downtown Fort Worth to Interstate 820 was transferred to newly completed freeway sections. On November 31, 1969, SH 121 was rerouted over Spur 459, which was cancelled. The old route of SH 121 was given to the city of Grapevine.

TxDOT proposed extending SH 121 to FM 1187, via a route to be known as the Northside–Southwest Freeway, on October 4, 1973. This proposed extension was canceled on August 29, 1985.

On April 14, 1980, SH 121 was relocated in Bedford and Grapevine. On November 18, 1999, SH 121 was rerouted over Spur 553, which was cancelled. The old route of SH 121 became Business SH 121. On February 27, 2003, the SH 121 designation was extended to US 67 in Cleburne. This extension, known as the Chisholm Trail Parkway (CTP), was built in stages from 2008 to 2014 and opened to traffic on May 11, 2014. The CTP's frontage roads in southwest Fort Worth are signed as SH 121.

Major intersections

Business routes

Randolph

Business State Highway 121-D (Bus. SH 121-D) is a business route of SH 121 that serves the town of Randolph. The highway was designated in 1990 with the mileage being transferred from Loop 451.

Bus. SH 121-D begins at an intersection with SH 121 and travels northeast before intersecting with FM 896. After intersecting with FM 896, the highway runs north and has a brief overlap with SH 11 through the town. After leaving the concurrency with SH 11, Bus. SH 121-D runs north and northeast before ending at an intersection with SH 121.

Junction list

Lewisville

Business State Highway 121-H (Bus. SH 121-H) is a business route of SH 121 that serves the town of Lewisville. The highway was designated in 1999 when SH 121 was re-routed around the city.

Bus. SH 121-H begins at an interchange with SH 121/Sam Rayburn Tollway in Coppell. The highway runs northeast through industrial areas of Lewisville and turns to the north at an interchange with FM 3040 (Round Grove Road)/Denton Tap Road. Bus. North of here, SH 121-H runs by many residential areas before meeting I-35E. North of I-35E, the highway runs just south of the city's central business district and turns in a northeast direction. At Main Street, Bus. SH 121-H turns in a more eastern direction and crosses over the Elm Fork Trinity River. The highway continues to run east and meets FM 544 at an intersection before ending at an interchange with SH 121/Sam Rayburn Tollway.

Junction list

See also
 Chisholm Trail Parkway
 Sam Rayburn Tollway

References

External links

Denton & Collin County section of SH 121 - from dfwfreeways.info

121
Transportation in Tarrant County, Texas
Transportation in Dallas County, Texas
Transportation in Denton County, Texas
Transportation in Collin County, Texas
Transportation in Fannin County, Texas